The 2023 Supersport 300 World Championship will be the seventh season of the Supersport 300 World Championship. Álvaro Díaz was world champion in this class last year.

Race calendar

The provisional 2023 season calendar was announced on 8 November 2022. It was then updated on 28 February 2023 to announce the fourth round at Imola Circuit on 14–16 July.

Entry list

Championship standings
Points

Riders' championship

Teams' championship

Manufacturers' championship

References

External links 

Supersport 300 World Championship seasons
Supersport 300 World Championship
Supersport 300 World Championship